Dexopollenia disemura is a species of cluster fly in the family Polleniidae.

Distribution
China.

References

Polleniidae
Insects described in 1993
Diptera of Asia